The list of ship decommissionings in 1898 includes a chronological list of all ships decommissioned in 1898.


See also 

1898
 Ship decommissionings